Henry Kistemaeckers may refer to:

 Henry Kistemaeckers (publisher), 1851–1934
 Henry Kistemaeckers (playwright), 1872–1938